Mastroianni is a family name in the Italian language derived from a compound title of respect formed from mastro (master, craftsman) and gianni shortened form of the given name Giovanni  and may refer to:

 Armand Mastroianni (born 1948), American film director
 Chiara Mastroianni (born 1972), Italian-French actress, daughter of Marcello Mastroianni
 Darin Mastroianni (born 1985), American baseball player
 Marcello Mastroianni (1924–1996), Italian actor
 Mark G. Mastroianni (born 1964), American Judge and former Massachusetts District Attorney
 Mason Mastroianni, American comic artist
 Pat Mastroianni (born 1971), Canadian actor
 Ruggero Mastroianni (1929–1996), Italian film editor
 Umberto Mastroianni (1910–1998), Italian abstract sculptor

It is cognate with the Greek Mastrogiannis (Μαστρογιάννης):
 Sam Mastrogiannis (born 1942), Greek-American poker player

Italian-language surnames